Events from the year 1957 in France.

Incumbents
President: Rene Coty 
President of the Council of Ministers: 
 until 13 June: Guy Mollet
 13 June-6 November: Maurice Bourgès-Maunoury
 starting 6 November: Félix Gaillard

Events
4 February – France prohibits United Nation involvement in Algeria.
1 March – Sud Aviation forms from a merger between SNCASE (Société Nationale de Constructions Aéronautiques du Sud Est) and SNCASO (Société Nationale de Constructions Aéronautiques du Sud Ouest).
20 March – Newspaper L'Express reveals that the French army tortures Algerian prisoners.
25 March – Treaty of Rome, signed by France, West Germany, Italy, Belgium, the Netherlands and Luxembourg), establishes the European Economic Community (EEC).
26 May – Algerian politician killed by Algerian nationalists during soccer game
First American writers of the Beat Generation (poets Allen Ginsberg and Peter Orlovsky) stay at the "Beat Hotel" (Hotel Rachou) in Paris.

Sport
27 June – Tour de France begins.
20 July – Tour de France ends, won by Jacques Anquetil.

Births
4 January – Joël Bats, international soccer player and coach
11 January – Alain Lemercier, racewalker
13 January – Bruno Baronchelli, soccer player
12 March – Patrick Battiston, international soccer player
3 April – Yves Chaland, cartoonist (died 1990)
25 May – Véronique Augereau, actress
18 August – Carole Bouquet, actress
25 September – Jean-Pierre Demailly, mathematician (died 2022)
12 October 
 Clémentine Célarié, actress
 Rémi Laurent, actor (died 1989)
3 December – Valérie Quennessen, actress (died 1989)

Deaths
14 May – Marie Vassilieff, Russian-born painter (born 1884)
23 October – Christian Dior, fashion designer (born 1905)
4 November – Joseph Canteloube, composer (born 1879)
6 December – Robert Esnault-Pelterie, pioneering aircraft designer (born 1881)

See also
 1957 in French television
 List of French films of 1957

References

1950s in France